Kirill Yurievich Grebenshchikov (born June 22, 1972, Moscow) is a  Russian film and theater actor.

Biography 
Kirill Grebenshchikov was born June 22, 1972 in a family of actors. In 1989 he entered the Producer's Department at Moscow Art Theater School, where two years unlearn. In 1991 he enrolled in the acting department.
After graduation he worked for two years at the Stanislavski Theatre. A short time at the end of 1997 he worked in the Moscow Youth Theatre.

In 1998-1999 he conducted on the channel Russia-K children's program Wonder Tale. In 1997 he enrolled in an acting troupe of the Anatoly Vasiliev's theater. Where he works to this day.

The first experience in the cinema took place in 1992.

Selected filmography
 1992 —  Russian Romance (episode)
 1994 —  At Daggers Drawn (episode)
 1999 —  The Barber of Siberia as junker
 2004 —  Place in the Sun as Kuzmenko
 2006 —  The Brothers Karamazov as Jesus
 2010 —  House of Babies as Lev
 2014 — Pregnancy Test as Andrey Pavlovich Lazarev
 2017 — Anna Karenina: Vronsky's Story as Sergey Karenin

References

External links
 

1972 births
Living people
20th-century Russian male actors
Russian male film actors
Russian male stage actors
Russian male television actors
Male actors from Moscow
Russian television presenters
21st-century Russian male actors
Moscow Art Theatre School alumni